The 2001 European Curling Championships were held in Vierumäki, Finland, on December 8–15.

Men's

A tournament

Final round-robin standings

Draws

Draw 1
 Denmark 10–3  Finland 
 Sweden 4–3  Switzerland 
 Norway 8–5  Germany 
 Scotland 8–5  France 
 Czech Republic 6–5  Italy

Draw 2
 Sweden 8–6  Italy 
 Germany 9–1  Czech Republic 
 Finland 7–1  France 
 Norway 6–3  Denmark 
 Switzerland 6–1  Scotland

Draw 3
 Scotland 9–5  Czech Republic 
 France 8–7  Denmark 
 Switzerland 6–5  Italy 
 Finland 8–4  Germany 
 Norway 7–5  Sweden

Draw 4
 Switzerland 8–7  Denmark 
 Norway 8–4  Finland 
 Sweden 9–5  Czech Republic 
 Scotland 9–2  Italy 
 Germany 9–2  France

Draw 5
 Norway 11–5  Italy 
 Switzerland 8–4  Germany 
 Scotland 7–5  Denmark 
 Sweden 8–1  France 
 Finland 8–4  Czech Republic

Draw 6
 France 7–5  Czech Republic 
 Finland 11–6  Scotland 
 Sweden 9–8  Germany 
 Switzerland 9–3  Norway 
 Italy 7–6  Denmark

Draw 7
 Sweden 7–6  Finland 
 Denmark 9–8  Czech Republic 
 Switzerland 6–5  France 
 Germany 11–3  Italy 
 Norway 6–3  Scotland

Draw 8
 Scotland 9–4  Germany 
 France 6–4  Italy 
 Czech Republic 8–7  Norway 
 Denmark 7–6  Sweden 
 Finland 7–2  Switzerland

Draw 9
 France 10–6  Norway 
 Sweden 11–5  Scotland 
 Finland 9–3  Italy 
 Switzerland 9–2  Czech Republic 
 Denmark 7–6  Germany

Playoffs

Medals

Women's

A tournament

Final round-robin standings

Draws

Draw 1
 Sweden 7–6  Norway 
 Germany 8–5  Switzerland 
 Denmark 10–4  Scotland 
 Russia 4–3  Finland

Draw 2
 Denmark 8–5  Finland 
 Scotland 7–3  Russia 
 Germany 9–2  Norway 
 Sweden 5–4  Switzerland

Draw 3
 Germany 5–4  Scotland 
 Sweden 8–3  Finland 
 Switzerland 10–4  Russia 
 Denmark 9–6  Norway

Draw 4
 Denmark 7–3  Switzerland 
 Norway 5–4  Russia 
 Sweden 5–4  Scotland 
 Germany 8–6  Finland

Draw 5
 Sweden 9–3  Russia 
 Germany 9–4  Denmark 
 Switzerland 8–6  Finland 
 Norway 10–9  Scotland

Draw 6
 Switzerland 7–4  Norway 
 Scotland 10–2  Finland 
 Sweden 9–5  Germany 
 Denmark 10–8  Russia

Draw 7
 Germany 6–5  Russia 
 Sweden 11–4  Denmark 
 Norway 7–5  Finland 
 Switzerland 7–4  Scotland

Playoffs

Medals

References
Men: 
Women: 

Curling Championships
European Curling Championships
2001 in European sport
2001 in Finnish sport
International curling competitions hosted by Finland
Sport in Heinola
Vierumäki